Jazz drummers play percussion (predominantly the drum set) in jazz, jazz fusion, and other jazz subgenres such as latin jazz. The techniques and instrumentation of this type of performance have evolved over the 1900s, influenced by jazz at large and the individual drummers within it. Jazz required a method of playing percussion different from traditional European styles, one that was easily adaptable to the different rhythms of the new genre, fostering the creation of jazz drumming's hybrid technique. As each period in the evolution of jazz—swing and bebop, for example—tended to have its own rhythmic style, jazz drumming continued to evolve along with the music. In the 1970s and 1980s, jazz drumming incorporated elements of rock and Latin styles.

Notable jazz drummers include:

A

B

C

D

E

F

G

H

I

J

K

L

M

N

O

P

R

S

T

V

W

Z
 Ingar Zach (born 1971)

See also
 List of American jazz drummers

References

 
Drummers
Drummers